Mifflin is an unincorporated community in Crawford County, Indiana, in the United States.

History
A post office was established at Mifflin in 1848, and remained in operation until it was discontinued in 1967.

References

Unincorporated communities in Crawford County, Indiana
Unincorporated communities in Indiana